Skirza or Skirsa, is a small remote linear fishing village, overlooking Freswick Bay to the south and Skirza Head to the southeast, in  eastern Caithness, Scottish Highlands and is in the Scottish council area of Highland. The village of Freswick lies directly southwest of Skirza.

Broch
The remains of the 2nd or 3rd century Broch is located on the promontory of Skirza Head. It measures 22ft in diameter within a wall 14ft thick with the entrance in the south-southeast and is protected on the landward side by a 30 foot ditch. South of the entrance is a basin which is some 10ft deep and 10ft by 7ft across.

References

Populated places in Caithness